Botigues is a small island barangay in the Don group occupying the whole of Botique Island. The barangay is located to the southwest of Bantayan Island and is part of the municipality of Bantayan, Cebu.

References

External links
Botigues Island

Islands of the Don group (Bantayan)
Barangays of Cebu